Sunil Barve (born 6 October 1966) is an Indian film, television and theatre actor, singer and producer. Predominantly working in Marathi, he has also worked in Hindi and Gujarati entertainment industry. He is also a radio jockey. He started doing small roles for serials and theatres and starred in several Marathi films and serials. After 25 years in the industry, he launched an initiative named Herbarium through his production company Subak to "bring back the lost glory of Marathi musical plays".

Career
Barve received a B.Sc. in Chemistry from Patkar College, Mumbai and worked as a medical representative in a company in Mumbai, but quit this job and turned towards acting.

Sunil Barve's production company Subak (Sunil Barve Kalakruti) has produced various plays. In 2010, as Barve completed 25 years in the Marathi theatre, he launched a new project called Herbarium. He reported that he wanted to "bring back the lost glory of Marathi musical plays" through this project and remade five classic plays with new directors and new cast; the theater directors were Pratima Kulkarni, Chandrakant Kulkarni, Mangesh Kadam, Vijay Kenkre and Girish Joshi, and Barve asked the directors to choose their play. Twenty-five performances of each play were given in various cities of Maharashtra and Goa. Barve noted that he desired only twenty-five performances of each play to match his twenty-five years in show business. The first play, performed in July 2010, was the classic comedy Suryachi Pille originally directed by Damu Kenkre in 1978 with a cast including Madhav Vatve, Bal Karve, Dilip Prabhavalkar, Mohan Gokhale, Sadashiv Amrapurkar and Shanta Jog. The new play is directed by Pratima Kulkarni and stars Uday Sabnis, Pushkar Shrotri, Aniket Vishwasrao and Aatisha Naik. The play is a comedy around three sons trying to prove their superiority in order to inherit their late father's legacy. Though the play and its star-cast was decided in advance, Barve decided to keep the name of the next play a surprise, to be announced only at the 25th show of the currently performed play.

Filmography

Films

Television

Theatre in Marathi 
 Chaar Choughi
 Zopi Gelela Jaga Zaala (2013)
 Tisre Badshah Hum (2020)

Web series

References

External links
 

Male actors in Marathi cinema
Indian male television actors
Male actors in Hindi cinema
Indian theatre managers and producers
Male actors in Marathi theatre
1966 births
Living people
Male actors in Marathi television